Jean-Louis Gauthier (22 December 1955 – 11 July 2014) was a French professional road bicycle racer. He was professional from 1977 to 1987 and won 2 victories. He won a stage in the 1980 Tour de France and wore the yellow jersey as leader of the general classification for one day in the 1983 Tour de France.

Career achievements

Major results

1980
Vailly-sur-Sauldre
Tour de France:
Winner stage 6
1983
Tour de France:
Wearing yellow jersey for one day
1987
Breuillet

Grand Tour general classification results timeline

References

External links

1955 births
2014 deaths
People from Angoulême
French male cyclists
French Tour de France stage winners
Place of death missing
Sportspeople from Charente
Cyclists from Nouvelle-Aquitaine